Victor is both a given name and a surname. It is Latin in origin meaning winner or conqueror.

Although not directly associated with a Biblical name, Victor is one of the earliest Christian names, borne (as Vittorio) by several saints and popes, symbolizing Christ's victory over sin and death.

Translations 

Albanian: 
Amharic: 
Arabic:
 Direct derivation:  Vīktūr
 Equivalent meaning:  Ẓāfir  (literally "victor, conqueror");  Manṣūr,  Muntaṣir (both meaning "given victory");  Fawwāz ("winner")
Armenian: Վիկտոր (Viktor);  (Viken, Vigen)
Asturian: Vítor
Basque: Bittor
Belarusian:  (Viktar)
Bulgarian:  (Viktor)
Catalan: Víctor
Chinese: , Wéikètuō
Czech: Viktor
Danish: Viktor, Victor
Dutch: Viktor, Victor
English: Victor, Vic
Estonian: Viktor
Filipino: Biktor
Finnish: Vihtori, Viktor
French: Victor (Victoire)
Galician: Vítor
German: Viktor, Victor
Greek: Βίκτωρας (Viktoras)
Gujarati:  (Vikṭara)        
Hausa: Mainasara
Hawai'ian: Wikoli
Hebrew:  (Viktor),  (Avigdor)
Hindi: , Vijētā, Abhijeet
Hungarian: Viktor, Győző
Ibibio: Àkàn
Igbo: Ùgò
Irish: Buadhach
Italian: Vittorio, Vittore, Vittorino, Rino
Japanese:  (Bikutā)
Kannada: , Jayaśāli
Kinyarwanda: Mutsinzi
Korean:  (Biktoreu),  (Bikteo)
Late Roman: Victorinus, Victorius
Latvian: Viktors
Lithuanian: Viktoras
Macedonian: Виктор (Viktor)
Marathi:  (Vijētā)
Mongolian: Виктор (Viktor)
Nepali:  (Vikṭara)
Norwegian: Viktor 
Persian: Pirooz
Polish: Wiktor
Portuguese: Vítor, Victor
Romanian: Victor
Russian:  (Victor, Viktor)
Serbian:  (Viktor)
Slovak: Viktor
Somali: Guled
Spanish: Víctor, Victorio, Victoriano, Victorino
Swedish: Victor, Viktor
Tamil:  (Vañci)
Telugu:  (Vikṭar)
Turkish: Galip, Muzaffer, Utku, Zafer
Ukrainian:  (Viktor)
 Uzbek: G'olib, Muzaffar, Viktor
Vietnamese: Victor
Welsh: Gwythyr
Yiddish:  (Viktor)
Yoruba: Segun

People with the given name and mononym

Aristocracy 
Victor Amadeus I, Duke of Savoy (1587–1637)
Victor Amadeus II of Sardinia (1666–1732)
Victor Amadeus III of Sardinia (1726–1796)
Victor de Broglie (1756–1794), French soldier and politician, son of the 2nd duc de Broglie
Victor de Broglie (1785–1870), 3rd duc de Broglie, French statesman and diplomat 
Victor de Broglie (1846–1906), 5th duc de Broglie, French politician and diplomat
Victor Emmanuel I of Sardinia (1759–1824), Duke of Savoy and King of Sardinia
Victor Emmanuel II of Italy (1820–1878), King of Sardinia
Victor Emmanuel III of Italy (1869–1947), King of Italy

Religion 
Pope Victor I (died 199), also a saint
Pope Victor II (c. 1018–1057)
Pope Victor III (c. 1026–1087)
Antipope Victor IV (1138)
Antipope Victor IV (1159–1164)
Victor of Marseilles (died c. 290), a saint
Victor Maurus (died c. 303), Victor the Moor or Victor of Milan, a saint
Viktor of Xanten (died 4th century), a saint
Victor I (bishop of Chur)
Victor II (bishop of Chur)
Victor III (bishop of Chur) (died in or before 836)

Academics 
Victor Babeş (1854–1926), Romanian biologist
Victor Dzau (born 1945), Chinese-American doctor and academic
Viktor Frankl (1905–1997), Austrian psychiatrist
Victor Ginzburg (born 1957), Russian-American mathematician
Victor Goldschmidt (1888–1947), Norwegian mineralogist
Victor Gunnarsson (1953–1993), Swedish teacher who once prosecuted for the assassination of its prime minister
Viktor Kokochashvili (1904-1986), Georgian chemist 
Victor Loche (1806–1863), French zoologist
Victor Ninov (born 1959), Bulgarian physicist
Victor Ricciardi, American professor of business and author
Victor Skumin (born 1948), Russian psychiatrist, psychotherapist and psychologist
Victor Slăvescu (1891–1977), Romanian economist
Victor Vâlcovici (1885–1970), Romanian mechanician and mathematician

Arts and entertainment
Victor Ambrus (1935–2021), Hungarian-born British illustrator
Victor Anastasi (1913–1992), Maltese designer and draughtsman
Victor Borge (1909–2000), Danish-born American musician and comedian
Victor Buono (1938–1982), American actor
Victor Assis Brasil (1945–1981), Brazilian jazz saxophonist
Viktor Đerek (born 2000), Croatian photographer
Victor Fonfreide (1872–1934), French painter
Victor French (1934–1989), American actor
Victor Garber (born 1949), Canadian actor
Victor Hugo (1802–1885), French writer
Victor Honoré Janssens (1658–1736), Flemish painter
Víctor Jara (1932–1973), Chilean musician
Victor J. Kemper (born 1927), American cinematographer
Victor Martinez (author) (1954–2011), Mexican American poet and author
Victor Mature (1913–1999), American actor
Victor McLaglen (1886–1959), British actor
Victor Meirelles (1832–1903), Brazilian painter
Vic Mignogna (born 1962), American actor
Víctor Mora (comics) (1931–2016), Spanish writer of comic books
Viktor Preiss (born 1947), Czech actor
Victor Rasuk (born 1984), American actor
Victor Rathnayake (born 1942), Sri Lankan Sinhala folk musician
Victor Silvester (1900–1978), British dancer and bandleader
Victor Sloan (born 1945), Irish artist
Victor Socaciu (1953–2021), Romanian folk singer and composer
Victor Spinetti (1929–2012), Welsh actor
Víctor Trujillo (born 1961), Mexican comedian
Viktor Tsoi (1962–1990), Russian musician
Victor Willis (born 1951), American musician
Victor Yerrid (born 1971), American puppeteer and voice actor

Business
Victor Chandler (born 1951), British bookmaker and businessman
Victor Civita (1907–1990), Brazilian publisher
Victor Kassir (1910–1997), Lebanese businessman
Victor Kiam (1926–2001), American entrepreneur
Victor Li Tzar-kuoi (born 1964), Hong Kong businessman
Victor Vargas (born 1952), Venezuelan entrepreneur and philanthropist
Victor Vescovo (born 1966), American financier and undersea explorer

Crime 
Viktor Bout (born 1967), Russian arms dealer
Víctor Manuel Gerena (born 1958), American fugitive robber

Military 
Victor H. Czegka (1880–1973), Austrian-American Marine officer
Victor Gunasekara (1921-1993), Sri Lankan Sinhala army major and civil servant
Victor Jones (British Army officer), Second World War British Army officer
Viktor Nikolayevich Sokolov (born 1962), Russian naval officer
Viktor Zolotov, commander of Russias National Guard

Politics and diplomacy
Victor Banks (born 1947), Anguillan politician
Victor de Broglie (1756–1794), French soldier and politician
Victor de Broglie (1785–1870), 3rd duc de Broglie, French statesman and diplomat 
Victor de Broglie (1846–1906), 5th duc de Broglie, French politician and diplomat
Victor Ciorbea (born 1954), Romanian politician
Victor Corea (1871-1962), Sri Lankan Sinhala politician and lawyer
Victor Deleu (1876–1939), Romanian politician
Victor Gram ((1910–1969), Danish politician 
Victor Kamber (born 1943), American political consultant
Viktor Klima (born 1947), Austrian politician
Víctor Hipólito Martínez (1924–2017), former Vice President of Argentina
Victor A. Nicholas (1897-1956), second Sri Lankan to hold post of Postmaster General of Sri Lanka
Viktor Orbán (born 1963), Hungarian politician
Victor Owusu (1923-2000), Ghanaian lawyer and politician
Victor Perera, Sri Lankan governor
Victor Ponta (born 1972), Romanian politician
Victor Rădulescu-Pogoneanu (1910–1962), Romanian diplomat
Victor Garvin Weerawardana Ratnayake (1908-1994), Sri Lankan politician
Vico Sotto (born 1989), Filipino politician
Victor Stănculescu (1928–2016), Romanian general officer and politician
Victor Stern (1885 – 1958), Austrian philosopher and politician
Viktor Yanukovych (born 1950), Ukrainian politician
Viktor Yushchenko (born 1954), Ukrainian politician

Sports 
Viktor (wrestler) (Eric Thompson, born 1980), a Canadian professional wrestler 
Viktor Apostolov (born 1962), Bulgarian hammer thrower
Viktor Axelsen (born 1994), Danish badminton player and men's singles world champion
Victor Leandro Bagy (born 1983), Brazilian football goalkeeper known simply as Victor
Vítor Baía (born 1969), Portuguese football player
Víctor Manuel Baute (born 1972), Spanish boxer
Vitor Belfort (born 1977), Brazilian mixed martial artist
Vic Bellamy (born 1963), American football player
Viktor Berg (born 1977), Canadian squash player
Víctor Bird (born 1982), Puerto Rican volleyball player
Víctor Blasco (born 1994), Spanish footballer
Victor Corrêa (born 1990), Brazilian race car driver
Victor Cruz (American football) (born 1986), American football player
Victor Davis (1964–1989), Canadian Olympic champion swimmer
Victor Dimukeje (born 1999), American football player
Viktor Fischer (born 1994), Danish footballer
Víctor Genés (born 1961), Paraguayan footballer and football manager
Víctor Hugo González (born 1974), Colombian cyclist
Victor Hedman (born 1990), National Hockey League player from Sweden
Victor Heflin (born 1960), American football player
Víctor Herrera (cyclist) (born 1970), Colombian cyclist
Víctor Herrera Piggott (born 1980), Panamanian footballer
Victor Hicks (born 1957), American football player
Victor Houston (athlete) (born 1974), Barbadian track and field athlete
Victor Jones (cricketer) (1881–1923), Australian cricketer
Victor Jones (linebacker) (born 1966), American football player
Victor Jones (running back) (born 1967), American football player
Viktor Kassai (born 1975), Hungarian football referee
Victor Kros (born 1981), Dutch football player
Viktor Kuznetsov (swimmer) (born 1961), Russian swimmer
Victor Leandro Bagy (born 1983), Brazilian football player
Victor Lindelöf (born 1994) Swedish football player
Victor Loturi (born 2001), Canadian soccer player
Víctor Maldonado (born 1939), Venezuelan hurdler
Víctor Martínez (athlete) (born 1975), Andorran middle-distance runner
Víctor Martínez (baseball) (born 1978), Venezuelan-born Major League Baseball player
Víctor Martínez (bodybuilder) (born 1973), Dominican professional bodybuilder
Victor Matfield (born 1977), South African rugby player
Viktor Mazin (1954–2022), Soviet weightlifter
Viktor Mitrou (born 1973), Greek weightlifter
Víctor Mora (athlete) (born 1944), Colombian retired long-distance runner
Víctor Hugo Mora (born 1974), Mexican football manager
Víctor Moreno (born 1979), Venezuelan baseball player
Víctor Moreno (cyclist) (born 1985), Venezuelan cyclist
Víctor Muñoz (born 1957), Spanish football coach and player
Victor Oladipo (born 1992), American basketball player
Viktor Olsen (born 1924), Norwegian long-distance runner
Viktor Onopko (born 1969), Russian football coach and former player
Victor Ortíz (born 1987), American boxer
Victor Perez ("Young"; 1911–45), Tunisian world champion flyweight boxer
Victor Quintana (born 1976), Paraguayan football player
Víctor Rivera (football manager) (born 1968), Peruvian football manager
Victor Rivera (volleyball) (born 1976), Puerto Rican volleyball player
Victor Ross (1900–1974), American lacrosse player
Víctor Sánchez (born 1976), Spanish retired footballer
Victor "Vic" Seixas (born 1923), American Hall of Fame former top-10 tennis player
Victor Simões (born 1981), Brazilian footballer
Viktor Spasov (born 1957), Soviet pole vaulter
Viktor Troicki (born 1986), Serbian tennis player
Victor Trumper (1877–1915), Australian cricketer
 Victor Wembanyama (born 2004), French Basketball Player
Víctor Valdés (born 1982), Spanish retired football goalkeeper
Viktor Zaitsev (born 1966), Uzbekistani javelin thrower
Chick Zamick (1926–2007), Canadian ice hockey player and coach
Viktor Zhurba (born 1950), Soviet discus thrower

Other people
Victor Agosto (born 1985), American anti-war activist
Victor of Aveyron (1785–1828), French feral child
Victor Chang (1936–1991), Australian–Chinese cardiac surgeon
Victor Horta (1861–1947), Belgian architect
Victor Korchnoi (1931–2016), Soviet-born Swiss chess player
Víctor Martínez (disambiguation)
Victor Rivera (bishop) (1916–2005), American Episcopalian bishop
Victor Rivera Gonzalez (born 1948), Puerto Rican police chief and lawyer 
Viktor Schauberger (1885–1958), Austrian forester and inventor
Victor Ukpolo (born 1950), Nigerian-born American university administrator

People with the surname
 Alexander F. Victor (fl. 1910s–1920s), founder of the Victor Animatograph Corporation
Binjimen Victor (born 1997), American football player
Divya Victor (fl. 2009-), Tamil American poet
Idara Victor, American actress
Jaclyn Victor (born 1978), Malaysian musician

Fictional characters 
 Victor Baxter, in the television series That's So Raven and Cory in the House
 Victor Borin, a character in the Netflix series Grand Army
 Victor Borkowski, in the X-Men comics, also known as Anole 
 Victor Coste, friend of Sam Fisher in the Splinter Cell series of videogames
 Victor Creed, the real name of Sabretooth, a character from the X-Men series
 Victor Frankenstein, in the 1818 novel Frankenstein by Mary Shelley
 Victor Florescu, a character in the 1934 American romantic musical movie The Cat and the Fiddle
 Victor Fries, a villain in the Batman series, also known as Mr. Freeze
 "Count Victor Grazinski", alias of Victoria Grant, protagonist of the 1982 film Victor/Victoria
 Victor Grantz, a survivor in the video game Identity V
 Viktor Hargreeves, a character from The Umbrella Academy
 Victor Joseph, a character in the 1998 Canadian-American independent film Smoke Signals
 Victor Kiriakis, in the television series Days of Our Lives 
 Viktor Krum, in the Harry Potter series
 Vic Mackey, on the television series The Shield
 Victor Magtanggol, the titular character of the 2018 Philippine drama series Victor Magtanggol
 Victor Mancha, in the Runaways comic book
 Victor Meldrew, in the television series One Foot in the Grave
 Viktor Navorski, in the 2004 film The Terminal
 Victor Newman, in the television series The Young and the Restless
 Victor Nikiforov, in the Japanese television series Yuri on Ice
 Victor Quartermaine, in the television series Wallace and Gromit
 Victor Shade, alias for the Marvel superhero Vision
 Victor Stone, DC Comics superhero better known as Cyborg
 Victor "Sully" Sullivan, from the Uncharted series
 Victor Timely, from the Avengers comics, a divergent variant of Kang the Conqueror
 Victor Van Dort, in the 2005 animated film Corpse Bride
 Victor Vance, protagonist of the video game Grand Theft Auto: Vice City Stories
 Victor Von Doom, in the Fantastic Four comics
 Victor von Gerdenheim, in the Darkstalkers video game series
 Viktor (Suikoden), in the Suikoden video game series
 Victor Zsasz, a serial killer featured in the Batman series
 Victor (mascot), the logo and mascot for the Just for Laughs comedy festival
 Victor (Dollhouse), from Joss Whedon's Dollhouse
 Viktor (Underworld), from the Underworld film series
 Victor (Breaking Bad), an underling of criminal mastermind Gustavo Fring in the series Breaking Bad
 Victor, elder brother of Hugo in the Chinese television show Victor & Hugo: Bunglers in Crime and head of Naughtiness International
 Victor, a gargoyle supporting character from the 1996 Disney animated film The Hunchback of Notre Dame
 Victor Best, the brother of Victoria Best in WordGirl
 Victor Wexlar, the evil villain in Starflyers
 Victor, the main character in Victor and Valentino
 Victor, the dock worker in Clifford the Big Red Dog
 Victor, the ice rink janitor in Spy Fox 2: "Some Assembly Required"
 Victor Li, a main character in female oriented visual novel phone game Mr Love: Queen's Choice
 Victor Creel, a recurring character in Stranger Things (season 4).

See also 
Victor (disambiguation)
Saint Victorian (disambiguation)
St. Victor (disambiguation)
Victoria (disambiguation)
Victory (disambiguation)
Vittorio
Vincent (literally "winning" or "conquering")

English-language masculine given names
English masculine given names
Latin masculine given names
French masculine given names
Bulgarian masculine given names
Romanian masculine given names
Russian masculine given names
Ukrainian masculine given names